Ikoyi Cemetery is one of many landmarks located in Ikoyi, part of the Eti Osa local government area of Lagos state, Nigeria. Many prominent Nigerians such as Herbert Macaulay are interred at Ikoyi Cemetery.

Maintenance problems
Ikoyi Cemetery has recently fallen into disrepair with efforts by the Eti Osa local government to have private sector participation in the upgrade and upkeep of the cemetery.

Notable burials
 Herbert Macaulay
 Henry Carr
 Candido Da Rocha
 Orlando Martins

References

External links 
 

Ikoyi
Landmarks in Lagos
Cemeteries in Lagos